Moghavemate Mersad Shiraz  Football Club is an Iranian football club based in Shiraz, Iran.

Football clubs in Iran